The Comprehensive Guide to Board Wargaming is a 1977 book by Nicholas Palmer about the hobby of board wargaming.

Contents
The Comprehensive Guide to Board Wargaming is a 223-page book about the hobby of wargaming for non-gamers and gamers alike. The book covers the evolution of wargames, strategy and tactics employed, short reviews of the games that were available when the book was published, and concludes with a sample game as an example of the hobby for newcomers.

Reception
C. Ben Ostrander reviewed The Comprehensive Guide to Board Wargaming in The Space Gamer No. 13. Ostrander commented that "The nicest thing about this book is that a publisher somewhere feels wargaming is a good enough investment for a superior 'production' book. It will become a standard reference work for board wargaming. After all, the first is always in the position to become the book of any field."

In Issue 11 of Phoenix, Allan Frost called the book "a classic work on wargame theory and practice. Every self-respecting wargamer should acquire it." Although Frost noted the book's relatively high price (£6.50), he thought the book was worth the price as "a well produced, clearly illustrated, 223-page tome on all aspects of board wargaming as they exist at the present time." After a summary of the book's contents, Frost concluded with a strong recommendation, saying "No doubt this book will be regarded as the book on wargaming; certainly it will be a Herculean task for anyone to better it. Can you afford to be without it?"

References

1977 non-fiction books
Books by Nicholas Palmer
English-language books
Wargaming books